The V.Smile (stylized as V.SMILE TV LEARNING SYSTEM) is a sixth-generation educational home video game console manufactured and released by VTech. Titles are available on ROM cartridges called "Smartridges", to play off the system's educational nature. The graphics are primarily sprite-based. The console is often sold bundled with a particular game, with most of them having a game called Alphabet Park Adventure. Several variants of the V.Smile console are sold including handheld versions, or models with added functionality such as touch tablet integrated controllers or microphones. The V-Motion is a major variant with its own software lineup that includes motion sensitive controllers, and has Smartridges designed to take advantage of motion-related "active learning". The V-Motion and Smartridges however, are fully backwards compatible with other V.Smile variants and V.Smile Smartridges, and a V-Motion Smartridge can also be played on V.Smile console or handheld, albeit with limited functionality. In 2010, the new and old models of the V.Smile were discontinued. VTech still made games for the V.Smile until 2012.

Several versions of V.Smile and V-Motion consoles and handhelds have continued to be sold after newer models are introduced, allowing consumers a wide variety of consoles to choose from (frequently offered in an alternative pink color scheme) without worrying about a lack of backwards compatibility between games or consoles. Some key differentiators between systems and the ability to fully utilize all game functions include the options of a microphone, touch tablet, additional joystick port 
(for 2-player gameplay), stylus-enhanced controller, or motion sensitive game pad (with V-Motion).

Region protection and inter-compatibility

Even though the V.Smile range of games are compatible with most of its consoles, the V.Smile Baby games are not. The cartridges are shorter, but are also thicker and wider than normal V.Smile ones, meaning they cannot fit in other systems. However, both cartridges have the same connector and pins, meaning V.Smile Smartridges, which are slimmer and narrower, can be physically inserted into the V.Smile Baby and connected, although it's harder to do so, and the game will not work with the console.

The V.Smile range of consoles are apparently not region-locked. While the console itself come in NTSC and PAL versions and the BIOS on the consoles appear to be region specific (distinguishable from the speech sample played in the screen after the VTech logo when the console is started with no cartridge inserted), games purchased from an NTSC region can play on PAL systems and vice versa. Observations suggest that both the V.Smile and V.Smile Infant Development System used different methods of booting: The V.Smile and V.Smile Pocket variants will apparently boot into their own BIOS, then obligingly run the software on the cartridge. The V.Smile Baby appears to boot from the default BIOS when a cartridge of the same region is inserted or when there's no cartridge in the system, but appears to boot from a different BIOS when a cartridge of a different region is inserted. Currently it is unknown if the extra BIOS resides on the cartridge or on the console itself.

Criticisms
Research by the American Academy of Pediatrics (AAP) and the National Institutes of Health (NIH) show that Vtech's V.Smile Baby product, marketed for ages nine months to three years, does not meet the claims that it helps with early childhood development or education in any way, stating that children ages 0 to 2 years do not understand what is going on on a TV screen.

In October 2011, AAP's Council on Communications and Media released a report titled Media Use by Children Younger than 2 Years and concluded that "the educational merit of media for children younger than two years remains unproven despite the fact that three-quarters of the top selling infant videos make explicit or implicit educational claims", and further found that media viewing by children under 2 years of age can have a negative effect on language development.

Video game and technology critics are also quick to discount Vtech's line of products, including V.Smile (ages 4–8), V.Smile Baby (ages 9m–3), V.Flash (ages 5–10), V.Smile Pocket (ages 3–8), and V.Reader, citing the lack of professionally developed games, as VTech consoles have no major third party video game publishers aside from Disney Interactive.

Critics also state that the V.Smile proves the notion that the need for special electronics for children is artificial, as products like mainstream consoles (Xbox, PlayStation, Wii), tablets (iPad, Android), and computers (PC, Mac) have a variety of educational and children's software. Furthermore, such devices offer flexibility that allow children to grow with them, not outgrow them.

See also
 V.Flash
 VTech Socrates
 VTech

References

External links
 Official website (archived)
 20th Century Retro Games entry (gallery page for various VTech V.Smile models)

VTech
Educational toys
Sixth-generation video game consoles
Sunplus-based video game consoles